The Beverly Hills Speedway (also called the Los Angeles Speedway) was a  wooden board track for automobile racing in Beverly Hills, California. The former site is bounded by Wilshire Boulevard, South Beverly Drive, Olympic Boulevard and Lasky Drive. The project was financed by a group of racers and businessmen that called itself the Beverly Hills Speedway Association. The track was the first in the United States to be designed with banked turns incorporating an engineering solution known as a spiral easement.

The Speedway operated for four years and attracted many historically significant competitors including Ralph DePalma, Jimmy Murphy, and Tommy Milton.  It was also the site of a racing accident that killed National Champion (posthumous) and Indianapolis 500 winner Gaston Chevrolet in 1920.

Because of rapidly increasing real estate values, the Speedway became an uneconomical use of property. The track was torn down and the Association moved its racing operation a few miles away to Culver City, California in 1924.

History
Wooden board tracks were already established in the United States prior to World War I, and such a track had already been successful in Southern California.  The Los Angeles Motordrome in nearby Playa del Rey was the first-ever wooden track purpose-built for motorized competition.  The Motordrome created a sensation when it was built in 1910, attracting large crowds of paying spectators for two years before it was destroyed by a fire.

The Speedway Association consisted of eleven members around a nucleus of racer Cliff Durant (son of General Motors' William C. Durant) and William Danziger of the Rodeo Land and Water Company, and included future three-time Indianapolis 500 winner Louis Meyer.  The group purchased land from a bean farmer at $1,000 per acre (0.40 ha) in 1919 and began work once the farmer had harvested his crop.

The circular Motordrome in Playa del Rey had been built by contractor Jack Prince, a British former bicycle racer who was given the work on the strength of his experience building velodromes.  Prince had subsequently built a number of oval tracks, many of which suffered from badly designed transitions between the straightaways and curves.  The Association's civil engineer, Art Pillsbury, turned to Prince for consultation, found that he was a capable builder but was "quite innocent of any engineering knowledge," and so resorted to a method used by railroads, called the Searle Spiral Easement Curve, to design the track's layout and contours.

Prince and Pillsbury had set out to build the fastest race track in the nation, and they may have succeeded. The race was attended by 50,000 fans.

In addition to racing, the Speedway hosted other events such as horse shows, and was used as a movie location.  The Speedway hosted the opening and closing rounds of the Championship for its first three years, and only hosted a single contest in 1924.  The final race was held February 24, 1924, before a crowd of 85,000.  On that day Harlan Fengler broke the world record for a  race, averaging .

After just four years, the 70,000-seat stadium was disassembled to make room for other improvements, as the land was deemed more valuable than the track that lay atop it.  The property was sold to a developer for $10,000 per acre.  By 1928, the Beverly Wilshire hotel was built on the site of the track's north-west turn. The Speedway Association later opened a new track in Culver City, just south of MGM studios.

Races 
Statistics for winners of each race.

 ,  and 
 Gaston Chevrolet and Eddie O'Donnell collided and crashed into one another during the Thanksgiving Day Beverly Hills Speedway Classic race. Chevrolet and O'Donnell died in the crash, and Lyall Jolls, Chevrolet's riding mechanic, died the next day.

See also 
AAA Contest Board
American Championship car racing

Resources 

Beverly Hills, California
Motorsport venues in California
Sports venues demolished in 1924
Demolished sports venues in California